Z-gene or Z gene may refer to:
lacZ, a gene in the lac operon
Beta-galactosidase, the type of protein encoded by lacZ
Protein Z, a vitamin K-dependent glycoprotein involved in blood clotting
ZW sex-determination system